Aída Marina Arvizu Rivas (born 23 July 1963) is a Mexican politician formerly from the Social Democratic Party. From 2006 to 2009 she served as Deputy of the LX Legislature of the Mexican Congress representing the Federal District.

References

1963 births
Living people
Politicians from Chihuahua (state)
Women members of the Chamber of Deputies (Mexico)
Social Democratic Party (Mexico) politicians
21st-century Mexican politicians
21st-century Mexican women politicians
People from Ciudad Cuauhtémoc, Chihuahua
Deputies of the LX Legislature of Mexico
Members of the Chamber of Deputies (Mexico) for Mexico City